Blepephaeus nigrostigma is a species of beetle in the family Cerambycidae. It was described by Wang and Jiang in 1998. It is known from China.

References

Blepephaeus
Beetles described in 1998